Heartaches and Harmonies is a compilation box-set CD by the rock and roll duo The Everly Brothers, released in 1994.  It contains 103 songs spanning from a 1951 radio performance of "Don't Let Our Love Die" through 1990. It contains their early Cadence hits and a large representation of their Warner Bros. output. Alternate takes and less-successful singles are also included.

Track list
 "Don't Let Our Love Die [1951 Version]" (York) – 3:11
 "Keep A' Lovin' Me" (Don Everly, Phil Everly) – 2:27
 "Bye Bye Love" (Felice Bryant, Boudleaux Bryant) – 2:23
 "I Wonder If I Care as Much" (Everly, Everly) – 2:16
 "Hey Doll Baby [demo version]" (Traditional) – 2:16
 "Wake Up Little Susie" (Bryant, Bryant) – 2:03
 "Maybe Tomorrow" (Everly, Everly) – 2:08
 "All I Have to Do Is Dream" (Bryant, Bryant) – 2:21
 "Claudette" (Greenfield, Roy Orbison) – 2:16
 "Brand New Heartache" (Bryant, Bryant) – 2:18
 "Bird Dog" (Bryant) – 2:17
 "Devoted to You" (Bryant) – 2:25
 "Problems" (Bryant, Bryant) – 1:58
 "Long Time Gone" (Hartford, Ritter) – 2:26
 "I'm Here to Get My Baby Out of Jail" (Davis, Taylor) – 3:37
 "Kentucky" (Davis) – 3:09
 "Poor Jenny" (Bryant, Bryant) – 2:11
 "Take a Message to Mary" (Bryant, Bryant) – 2:28
 "(Till) I Kissed You" (Everly) – 2:24
 "Let It Be Me" (Becaud, Curtis, Delanoe) – 2:38
 "Since You Broke My Heart" (Everly) – 1:57
 "When Will I Be Loved?" (Everly) – 2:03
 "Like Strangers" (Bryant) – 2:00
 "Cathy's Clown" (Everly, Everly) – 2:26
 "Always It's You" (Bryant, Bryant) – 2:31
 "So Sad (To Watch Good Love Go Bad)" (Everly) – 2:36
 "That's What You Do to Me" (Montgomery, Sinks) – 2:04
 "The Price of Love" (Everly, Everly) – 2:24
 "Sleepless Nights" (Bryant, Bryant) – 1:52
 "Carol Jane" (Rich) – 2:34
 "Lucille" (Albert Collins, Little Richard) – 2:06
 "Made to Love" (Everly) – 1:57
 "Stick With Me Baby" (Mel Tillis) – 2:23
 "Love Hurts" (Bryant) – 2:18
 "So How Come (No One Loves Me)" (Bryant, Bryant) – 2:16
 "Donna Donna" (Bryant, Bryant) – 3:07
 "Ebony Eyes" (John D. Loudermilk) – 2:19
 "Walk Right Back" (Curtis) – 2:46
 "Why Not" (Loudermilk) – 2:14
 "Temptation" (Brown, Freed) – 3:28
 "Don't Blame Me" (Fields, McHugh) – 2:20
 "Muskrat" [Single Version] (Ann, Hensley, Travis) – 2:02
 "Crying in the Rain" (Greenfield, King) – 2:03
 "I'm Not Angry" (Howard) – 2:00
 "Step It Up and Go" (Howard) – 2:25
 "That's Old Fashioned (That's the Way Love Should Be)" (Baum, Giant, Kaye) – 1:51
 "How Can I Meet Her?" (Gerry Goffin, Keller) – 2:22
 "Nancy's Minuet" [Alternate Version] (Everly) – 2:03
 "Nice Guys" [alternate take] – 2:29
 "Don't Ask Me to Be Friends" – 2:07
 "No One Can Make My Sunshine Smile" (Goffin, Keller) – 1:57
 "(So It Was...So It Is) So It Always Will Be" (Altman) – 1:52
 "I'm Afraid" – 2:13
 "The Girl Sang the Blues" (Barry Mann, Cynthia Weil) – 2:21
 "Love Her" (Mann, Weil) – 2:19
 "The Ferris Wheel" (Blackwell, Blackwell) – 1:29
 "Things Go Better With Coke"
 "Gone, Gone, Gone" (Everly, Everly) – 2:05
 "Torture" – 2:26
 "You're My Girl" (Everly, Everly) – 2:27
 "It Only Costs a Dime" – 2:07
 "Love Is Strange" (Baker, Robinson, Smith) – 1:57
 "Man With Money" (Everly, Everly) – 2:55
 "To Show I Love You" – 2:22
 "I'll See Your Light" – 2:35
 "It's All Over" (Everly) – 2:44
 "I Used to Love You" – 2:22
 "And I'll Go" – 2:22
 "The Power of Love (You Got)" – 2:17
 "Leave My Woman Alone" (Ray Charles) – 2:40
 "Somebody Help Me" – 2:23
 "So Lonely" – 2:06
 "Kiss Your Man Goodbye" (Everly, Everly) – 2:39
 "The Collector" (Everly, Everly) – 2:36
 "Even If I Hold It in My Hand (Hard Luck Story)" – 2:58
 "Bowling Green" (Ertel, Terry Slater) – 3:29
 "I Don't Want to Love You" – 2:46
 "Mary Jane" – 2:43
 "Love of the Common People" (Hurley, Wilkins) – 3:16
 "You're Just What I Was Looking for Today" (Gerry Goffin, Carole King) – 3:08
 "Empty Boxes" (Elliott) – 2:46
 "Love With Your Heart" – 3:01
 "Milk Train" (Romeo) – 2:48
 "Lord of the Manor" (Terry Slater) – 4:51
 "Mama Tried" (Merle Haggard) – 2:20
 "T for Texas (Blue Yodel No. 1)" (Jimmie Rodgers) – 3:34
 "I Wonder If I Care as Much [Version 2]" (Everly, Everly) – 2:58
 "You Done Me Wrong" – 2:16
 "Turn Around" – 2:49
 "Omaha" (Terry Slater) – 3:22
 "I'm on My Way Home Again" (Stevens) – 2:23
 "Cuckoo" (Everly, Everly) – 2:45
 "Carolina in My Mind" (James Taylor) – 3:19
 "My Little Yellow Bird" – 2:05
 "Stories We Could Tell" (John Sebastian) – 3:22
 "Green River" (Everly, Everly) – 4:44
 "Poems, Prayers and Promises" (John Denver) – 4:02
 "Paradise" (John Prine) – 3:36
 "On the Wings of a Nightingale" (Paul McCartney) – 2:37
 "Why Worry	" (Mark Knopfler) – 4:49
 "Arms of Mary" (Ian Sutherland) – 2:30
 "Born Yesterday" (Everly) – 4:05
 "Don't Let Our Love Die [1990 Version]" (York) – 2:18

Personnel
Don Everly – guitar, vocals
Phil Everly – guitar, vocals

References

The Everly Brothers compilation albums
1994 compilation albums
Rhino Records compilation albums